IFK Sundsvall is a Swedish football club located in Sundsvall. The club was formed on 22 February 1895.

Background
Since their foundation IFK Sundsvall has participated mainly in the upper and middle divisions of the Swedish football league system.  They have spent five seasons in the Allsvenskan from 1976 to 1977 and 1979–81. The nearest they have come to premier status since was in 1992 when they played in the Kvalsvenskan after progressing from Division 1 Norra. The club currently plays in Division 2 Norra Svealand which is the fourth tier of Swedish football. They play their home matches at the Baldershovs IP in Sundsvall.

IFK Sundsvall are affiliated to the Medelpads Fotbollförbund.

Season to season

Achievements
 Division 1 Norra:
 Winners (1): 1992

Attendances
In recent seasons IFK Sundsvall have had the following average attendances:

The attendance record for IFK Sundsvall was 10,650 spectators for the match against IFK Norrköping in the Allsvenskan on 16 May 1976.

External links
 IFK Sundsvall – Official Website

Footnotes

Football clubs in Västernorrland County
Allsvenskan clubs
Sport in Sundsvall
Association football clubs established in 1895
1895 establishments in Sweden
Idrottsföreningen Kamraterna